Stanisław Grędziński (19 October 1945 – 19 January 2022) was a Polish sprinter who specialized in the 400 metres.

Career
Grędziński was born in Ostrzyca, Poland, and represented the club Górnik Wałbrzych. At the 1964 European Junior Championships he won silver medals in both 400 metres and 400 metres hurdles, as well as a silver medal in the medley relay where he ran the last leg. He became Polish 400 metres champion in 1966 and 1969.

He was successful at the European Championships with a gold medal in 1966 and a silver in 1969, both individually. In the relay he won a gold medal in 1966 and finished fourth in 1969. He also finished fourth in the 4 x 400 metre relay at the 1968 Summer Olympics. At the 1970 European Indoor Championships the Polish relay team won silver medals. His personal best time was 45.83 seconds, achieved in 1969.

Grędziński died on 19 January 2022, at the age of 77.

References

External links
 

1945 births
2022 deaths
Polish male sprinters
Athletes (track and field) at the 1968 Summer Olympics
Olympic athletes of Poland
People from Krasnystaw County
European Athletics Championships medalists
Sportspeople from Lublin Voivodeship
Śląsk Wrocław athletes
20th-century Polish people